The team eventing at the 2008 Summer Olympics took place between August 9 and 12 at the Hong Kong Sports Institute.

Team eventing consisted of three phases: dressage, cross-country, and show-jumping. Scores from each phase were converted into penalty points, which were summed to give a score. Teams of up to five horse and rider pairs competed; The team with the lowest total of penalty points, after adding together the Final scores of its three best riders will be the winner.

In the dressage portion, the pair performed in front of three judges. The judges gave marks of between 0 and 10 for each of ten required elements; the scores for the judges were averaged to give a score between 0 and 100. That score was then subtracted from 100 and multiplied by 1.5 to give the number of penalty points.

The cross-county portion consisted of a 4.56 kilometer course with 29 obstacles. The target time was eight minutes; pairs received .4 penalty points for every second above that time. They also received 20 penalty points for every obstacle not cleanly jumped.

The final phase was the show-jumping; pairs had to negotiate a course of obstacles. The pair received 4 penalty points for each obstacle at which there was a refusal or a knockdown of the obstacle. One penalty point was also assessed for each second taken above the maximum time for the course.

The results of the team phase were also used in the individual eventing event, though that event added a second jumping phase as a final.

Medalists

Results

Standings after Dressage 

Note: The team penalties given above are for the top three in each team at this stage and may not tally with the final total scores. The final results are determined by adding the total scores of the top three team members at the end of the competition.

Standings after Dressage and Cross Country 

Note: The penalty totals given for each team above are the scores of the top three team members after the Dressage and Cross-Country phases and may not tally with the overall result.

Final Result after Show jumping round 
Final results below, determined by combining the three best overall scores for each team.

# = Not counted towards team score.

References 
 Competition format

Equestrian at the 2008 Summer Olympics